The list of ship launches in 1785 includes a chronological list of some ships launched in 1785.


References

1785
Ship launches